The intermediolateral nucleus (IML) is a region of grey matter found in one of the three grey columns of the spinal cord, the lateral grey column. This is Rexed lamina VII.

The intermediolateral cell column exists at vertebral levels T1 – L3. It mediates the entire sympathetic innervation of the body, but the nucleus resides in the grey matter of the spinal cord.

Rexed Lamina VII contains several well defined nuclei including the nucleus dorsalis (Clarke's column), the intermediolateral nucleus, and the sacral autonomic nucleus.

It extends from T1 to L3, and contains the autonomic motor neurons that give rise to the preganglionic fibers of the sympathetic nervous system, (preganglionic sympathetic general visceral efferents).

References 

Spinal cord